Fanai Lalrempuia (born 11 May 1996) is an Indian professional footballer who plays as a central midfielder. He is known for his superb ball control, accurate passing and speed.

Career

Early career
Born in Lunglei, Mizoram, Lalrempuia started to play football from the age of 11 for his local side Bazarveng FC. Under the coaching of Flalbiakchhunga, his head coach at Bazarveng FC, Lalrempuia started to improve as a player. Eventually he was selected to join the Maomit High School under-14 side that was to compete in the Subroto Cup in 2010. While playing in the Subroto Cup Lalrempuia was spotted by Pune F.C. Academy assistant coach Gift Raikhan who then selected Fanai to trial at the academy. After the trial Lalrempuia was selected to join the academy. During his two seasons with the academy, Lalrempuia won the I-League U19 twice in 2012 and 2013 while also scoring a total of six goals during that time.

Pune
Then at the age of only 16, Lalrempuia made his professional debut for Pune in the I-League on 20 April 2013 against Air India at the Balewadi Sports Complex. He came on in the 55th minute of the match as a substitute for Velington Rocha as Pune went on to win the match 6–0. Lalrempuia scored his first goal in the I-League on 4 April 2015 against Bharat FC in the first ever Pune derby.

NorthEast United 
In 2016, Lalrenpuia has signed with Indian Super League club NorthEast United.

International
On 28 September 2013, it was announced that Lalrempuia had been selected into the 23-man squad for the India U19 side during the 2014 AFC U-19 Championship qualifiers. He then made his international debut for the country at the U19 level in India's first match of qualifiers against Qatar U20 on 4 October 2013. He started the match and lasted the full 90 minutes as India lost 2–0.

Career statistics

References

External links
 Pune Football Club Profile

1996 births
Living people
People from Lunglei district
Footballers from Mizoram
I-League players
Indian Super League players
Association football midfielders
Indian footballers
Pune FC players
NorthEast United FC players
RoundGlass Punjab FC players
India youth international footballers
FC Pune City players